Georges Goursat ( – ), known as Sem, was a French caricaturist famous during the Belle Époque.

Life and works

Youth (1863–1900)

Georges Goursat was born and raised in an upper-middle-class family from Périgueux. The wealth inherited from his father at the age of 21 allowed him to sustain a gilded youth.

In 1888 he self-published his first three albums of caricatures in Périgueux, signing some as "SEM", allegedly as a tribute to Amédée de Noé who signed his caricatures for Le Monde illustré as "Cham".

He settled in Bordeaux from 1890 to 1898. During this period, he published more albums and his first press caricatures in La Petite Gironde and discovered the work of Leonetto Cappiello. His style matured, becoming both simpler and more precise.

During the same period, he made trips to Paris. In 1891, he designed two posters printed in Jules Chéret's workshop for the singer Paulus. He published his first caricatures of artists in L'Illustration (Albert Brasseur) and Le Rire (Paulus, Polin and Yvette Guilbert).

Goursat lived in Marseille from 1898 to 1900, where he met Jean Lorrain who convinced him to live in Paris.

Belle Époque (1900–1914)
Goursat arrived in Paris in March 1900 at the time of the Universal Exposition opening.

He chose horse racing as a way to enter high society. In June 1900 he self-published his new album Le Turf of caricatures of many prominent Parisian socialites, including Marquess Boni de Castellane, Prince Trubetskoy, Count Clermont-Tonnerre, Baron Alphonse, Gustave de Rothschild, and Polaire. The album's success made him famous overnight. In October 1900 he published the album Paris-Trouville with equal success. Goursat published nine other albums before 1913.

In 1904, Goursat received the Légion d'honneur. In 1909, he exhibited with the painter Auguste Roubille, first in Paris and then in Monte Carlo and London. The exhibit included a diorama composed of hundreds of wooden figurines "of all the merely Paris celebrities".

World War I (1914–1918)
Goursat was not drafted in World War I as he was over 50 years old at the start of the war. He nevertheless involved himself as a war correspondent for Le Journal. Some of his rather "chauvinistic" articles had an "enormous impact". Ten articles were published in 1917 in Un pékin sur le front. Two other articles were incorporated in the 1923 book La Ronde de Nuit. In 1916 and 1918 Goursat published two albums of Croquis de Guerre with a completely different style than his previous work. He also designed war bond posters.

Années Folles (1918–1934)
After the war, Goursat returned to the kind of caricatures that made him famous. In 1919, he published Le Grand Monde à l'envers. Around 1923, he published three albums under the general title of Le Nouveau Monde. In 1923, he became an officer of the Légion d'honneur.

In 1929, he was severely impoverished by the economic crisis. After a heart attack in 1933, he died in 1934.

Personalities caricatured by Goursat

References

Images

Bibliography

External links
 Website dedicated to Georges Goursat
 Goursat in L'Illustration
 Biography of Goursat
 Description of the diorama

1863 births
1934 deaths
French caricaturists
French illustrators
French graphic designers
People from Périgueux
19th-century French painters
French male painters
20th-century French painters
19th-century French male artists
Belle Époque